The Kaska Dena Council  is a tribal council formed of five band governments of the Kaska Dena people in northern British Columbia, Yukon Territory, and Northwest Territories, Canada.

Member governments
The five member governments are the:
Daylu Dena Council
Dease River First Nation (official name simply "Dease River"), offices at Good Hope Lake, British Columbia
Kwadacha First Nation
Liard First Nation, offices in Watson Lake, Yukon but including reserves in British Columbia
Ross River Dena Council, offices in Ross River, Yukon

See also
Tahltan First Nation
Tribal Council
List of tribal councils in British Columbia

References

Tribal Council Detail, inac.gc.ca

Kaska Dena
First Nations governments in Yukon
First Nations tribal councils in British Columbia
Cassiar Country